The Tasmanian giant crab, Pseudocarcinus gigas (sometimes known as the giant deepwater crab, giant southern crab or queen crab) is a very large species of crab that resides on rocky and muddy bottoms in the oceans off Southern Australia. It is the only species in the genus Pseudocarcinus.

Habitat
The seasonal movements generally follow temperature as it prefers . The full temperature range where the species can be seen appears to be .

Description

Among crabs only the Japanese spider crab (Macrocheira kaempferi) can weigh more. Male Tasmanian giant crabs reach more than twice the size of females, which do not exceed . Males have one normal-sized and one oversized claw (which can be longer than the carapace width), while both claws are normal-sized in the females. This crab is mainly whitish-yellow below and red above; the tips of the claws are black. Small individuals are yellowish-and-red spotted above.

Behaviour
The Tasmanian giant crab feeds on carrion and slow-moving species, including gastropods, crustaceans (anomura and brachyura) and starfish. Cannibalism also occurs. They breed in June and July, and the female carries the 0.5–2 million eggs for about four months. After hatching, the planktonic larvae float with the current for about two months before settling on the bottom. The species is long-lived and slow-growing; juveniles moult their carapace every three-four years and adult females about once every nine years. This greatly limits the breeding frequency, as mating is only possible in the period immediately after the old carapace has been shed, and the new is still soft.

Fishery
The Tasmanian giant crab has been commercially fished in Tasmanian waters since 1992 and a minimum size was established in Australia in 1993. Twenty-five operators competed for the catch in 2005, delivering a total catch valued at about A$2 million. The Tasmanian giant crab is very long-lived and slow-growing, making it vulnerable to overfishing.

References

External links

Tasmanian giant crab
Crustaceans of Australia
Edible crustaceans
Commercial crustaceans
Marine fauna of Tasmania
Tasmanian giant crab